First Monday is a monthly peer-reviewed open access academic journal covering research on the Internet.

Publication
The journal is sponsored and hosted by the University of Illinois at Chicago. It is published on the first Monday of every month. In 2011, the journal had an acceptance rate of about 15%.

The journal has no article processing charges and no advertisements.

History
According to the chief editor, Edward Valauskas, the journal emerged before the open access model emerged:
“We didn’t call it open access in 1995 but we were certainly a precursor to the whole notion of open access. We felt very strongly that the journal should have all its content made freely available and we insisted with [the Danish publisher] Munksgaard that the scholars who contributed would retain copyright of their work that they published in the journal. We felt it would encourage scholars to contribute and then re-use their content in lots of different ways".

First Monday is among the first peer-reviewed journals on the Internet. It originated in the summer of 1995 with a proposal to start a new Internet-only, peer-reviewed journal about the Internet by eventual editor-in-chief Edward J. Valauskas to Munksgaard, a Danish publisher. Munksgaard agreed to publish the journal in September 1995. The first issue appeared on 6 May 1996, the first Monday of May, also the opening of the Fifth International World Wide Web Conference in Paris. The first issue was distributed at that conference on diskette as well as released on the Internet from a server in Copenhagen at the address www.firstmonday.dk.

In December 1998, Munksgaard sold the journal to three of the editors: Edward J. Valauskas, Esther Dyson, and Rishab Aiyer Ghosh. The server was moved from Copenhagen to the University of Illinois at Chicago's Library. The first issue based on a server in Chicago appeared 4 January 1999.

Conferences
The first First Monday conference took place 4–6 November 2001 in Maastricht at the International Institute of Infonomics. To celebrate First Monday’s 10th birthday in 2006, a conference took place at the University of Illinois at Chicago, 15–17 May 2006. The theme of the conference was Openness: Code, science and content. Over 200 participants from over 30 countries took part in the meeting. Papers from the Conference were published in the June and July issues. The conference was sponsored by The Open Society Institute, The John D. and Catherine T. MacArthur Foundation, The University of Illinois at Chicago University Library and The Maastricht Economic Research Institute on Innovation and Technology (MERIT), University of Maastricht.

References

External links
 
 A discussion with the journal's founder in 2006

Computer science journals
Cultural journals
Digital humanities
English-language journals
Mass media about Internet culture
Monthly journals
Open access journals
Publications established in 1996
University of Illinois Chicago
1996 establishments in Illinois